The 2010 Eastern Creek 8 Hour Production Car Race was an endurance motor race for production cars.  It was staged on 12 December 2010 at the Eastern Creek International Raceway in New South Wales, Australia. Jim Hunter, Barton Mawer and Gavin Bullas won the race at the wheel of a Subaru Impreza WRX STI; completing 249 laps, one more than the second place team of Barry Morcom, Nathan Morcom and Garry Holt, driving a BMW 335i. Third place went to father and son pairing Tony and Klark Quinn, who finished ten laps down from the winners, in a Mitsubishi Lancer Evolution IX.

Eligibility
The race was open to production based cars complying with the technical regulations for any one of the following:
 CAMS Group 3E Production Cars
 New Zealand Production Racing
 FIA Group N Production Cars
 Hong Kong Touring Car Championship (Super Production 2000cc class)

Classes
The race featured five classes:
 Class A:
 Class B:
 Class D: Production Sports Cars up to 2 Litres
 Class E:
 Class F:

Names for classes other than Class D are not known.

Results

See also
2011 Eastern Creek Six Hour
Motorsport in Australia

References

External links
 Images from www.flickr.com

Eastern Creek 8 Hour Production Car Race
Motorsport at Eastern Creek Raceway
December 2010 sports events in Australia